England Deaf Cricket Team represents England and Wales in international deaf cricket. The team, consisting of players who are Deaf or hearing impaired, is one of the England and Wales Cricket Board's (ECB) four disability teams. The team has participated in international cricket since 1992, runners-up in 1995/6, 2005 Deaf world cups and the 2011 DICC champions trophy.

At the international level, Deaf Cricketers must have a minimum hearing loss of 55dB in both ears. On the playing field, players must play without their hearing aids/cochlear implants. In terms of communication; the England Deaf cricket team has a mixture of BSL users, Sign Supported English users and Spoken English.

The current head coach is Jason Weaver. He is assisted by former captain, Paul Allen.

Players 
There are estimated to be over 2,000 deaf/hearing impaired cricketers in England and Wales. The current national squad is currently selected from a known pool of 400 players.

Current Squad

Honours Board

History

1990s

The first Deaf Ashes. 
Following conversations between deaf cricket pioneers, Steve May, John Webb, Robert Craven and David Morris in 1988, it was agreed to set up the first ever test matches between two international deaf teams. The Great Britain Deaf cricket team fundraised £25,000 with £3500 from the British Deaf Sports Council to host the series.

New Years’ Eve 1992, the Great Britain Deaf cricket team arrived in Perth to a warm welcoming party at the Perth Deaf Centre. The first ever test cricket match was played at Perth, unfortunately for the visitors they were defeated by 10 wickets. The following four matches were played in Adelaide, Sydney, Melbourne, and Brisbane. England lost the Ashes 4-0 (one draw).  

Current player, Umesh Valjee, was a playing member of the travelling squad. He scored 191 runs in 5 matches, averaging 19.10. Only bettered in the England side by Philip Ottaway who scored 202 runs, averaging 20.20. England’s leading wicket takers in this series was Umesh Valjee (10), John Everitt (9), and Peter Jones (9).

Hosting Australia 
In the summer of 1994, Australia visited England to contest the Deaf Ashes, beating a stronger England side 2-0 in a four-match series to retain the Ashes. The first game was played at Abbeydale Park in South Yorkshire (Sheffield Collegiate Cricket Club’s home ground), England batted first and collapsed to 114ao in a mere 63.2 overs. Australia, led by opener Chris Ashenden (scored 212), batted quickly to reach 338/5 before declaring with a lead of 214 runs. GB’s response was valiant but to no avail with Australia chasing down 88 runs in the final innings without losing a wicket.  

The following games ran in a similar fashion with the weather intervening to prevent an Australian whitewash. There were some notable standout performances from the GB side including: Umesh Valjee’s 129 runs (first-ever GB test hundred) and 4-81 in the final game; Ross MacCauliffe’ 4-22 in the second game; and Philip Ottaway’s 96 in the first game.

First Deaf (ODI) World Cup (Victoria, Australia) 
The first Deaf Cricket World Cup was hosted by Deaf Cricket Australia in Victoria. Despite losing their first game against India, England steamed through the round-robin stages, comfortably beating Sri-Lanka, Pakistan, South Africa, before reaching the Semi-Finals where they once again faced India. This time round, they it was the English who came up top, scoring 245 with Phillip Ottaway scoring a surprise 117 and Umesh controversially mankarded for 96. The English bowlers fired up, bowled India out for 207 to reach the final where Australia awaited.

In the final, England batted first against the hosts, they scored 261/6 from their 50 overs. Mike O'Mahony top scoring with 116. However, in front of a raucous crowd, the Australians led by their skipper, held their nerve to chase it down in 47 overs. England return home, runners up.

2000s

Visiting Australia 
After an eight-year break from international cricket, England returned to Australia in 2004 to contest the third Deaf Ashes. They played five ODIs and three Tests in five weeks visiting Sydney, Brisbane and Melbourne. They lost majority of their games. Australia whitewashing the visitors in the ODI series (5-0) and the cherry on top for the hosts, retaining the Deaf Ashes once again (1-0). Umesh Valjee's 186*, a memorable moment for the visitors.

Umesh Valjee top-scored in the series with 494 runs (averaging 54.89) supported by Mike O'Mahony with 357 runs (32.45) and Ben Young with 313 runs (averaging 28.45). Ross MacCauliffe being the pick of the bowlers with 10 wickets and Stefan Pichowski snatching 7 wickets. Darrell Sykes, Paul Allen and Mark Woodman all taking 6 wickets.

Deaf Cricket (ODI) World Cup 2005 (Lucknow, India) 
England flew to India with high hopes, however after a tough start, losing three of their first four games. They stumbled into the semi-final with a convincing win over New Zealand (winning by 178 runs). They beat their old foe, Australia, in the Semi-Final. Paul Allen taking 4-25 to restrict the Aussies to 153, which England chased down in 43 overs despite some tense moments.

India awaited them in the final at the K.D. Singh Babu Stadium. Umesh Valjee won the toss and put the hosts into bat. India scored a highly competitive 193, taking advantage of some wayward bowling from the visitors. India took regular wickets to win their first World Cup. England runners-up again.

Hosting Pakistan 
England hosted Pakistan for the first time in 2006. They played five games, which formed 2 ODIs, 2 T20s and one Test. It was a well-contested series which resulted in 2 wins for the hosts and 2 wins for the visitors and a drawn Test.

Mike O'Mahony returned to form with the bat scoring 170 runs from his 6 innings. Ben Young followed up his good World Cup with 152 runs from his 6 innings. Newcomer, Blyth Duncan was the pick of the bowlers with 10 wickets (averaging 8.3), Nigel Davenport also took 10 wickets across the series.

The ECB era starts

2010s

Triangular Series in Geelong, Australia 
Deaf Ashes

England played one test match against Australia to contest the 2011 Deaf Ashes. England started well, bowling Australia out for 157, the pick of the bowlers was Paul Allen taking 4/65, supported by Debutant George Greenway who took his first international wicket. In response, Umesh's century (104*) took England into a slender 28 run first inning lead.

Austraila sensing a possible defeat grinded through several sessions ending with 246ao (Stephen George 5/72 and Paul Allen 4/65), a lead of 218. England went about their chase in a hurry in search of a win, unfortunately time was not on their side despite James Schofield's best efforts (74*), England ended on 129/7 and Australia retained the Deaf Ashes.

Tri-Series

This was followed by White-ball Tri-Series between Australia, England and South Africa which was organised into two competitions; ODIs and T20s.

After convincingly beating both South Africa and Australia in the round robin matches. England lost the ODI series final to Australia. England were bowled out for a misery 62ao which was easily chased by the hosts for the lost of one wicket.

England had better luck in the t20 series, beating Australia after restricting the hosts to 90/9 off 20 overs. England's top three got them over the line to win the T20 series.

South Africa Whitewash 
England visited South Africa in September 2013 to contest the first Deaf cricket international series in South Africa. The series was hosted by Northerns Cricket Union at Sinovich Park.

England proved too strong for the hosts having completed a 6-0 series win. Particular highlights for the visitors included two-hundred opening partnership between Umesh Valjee and James Schofield (both falling for 95), Stephen George's first international century, and George Greenways' memorable 7-22.

Stephen George was awarded disability cricketer of the year 2013 due to his performances across the series.

DICC Championship (Dubai, UAE) 
The DICC championship in 2016 was contested between England, India, Pakistan and South Africa. After the first game against South Africa was abandoned due to weather, England beat Pakistan by 16 runs in their second game. In an essentially knock-out game between England and India, India was controversially found to be breaking International Deaf Cricket regulations due to a player wearing a hearing aid, which meant they were forced to forfeit and England were through to the final.

Unfortunately, England lost to Pakistan in the final at Sharjah Stadium. England batted first scoring 225/6 from 50 overs with contributions from Umesh Valjee (63), Sam Critchard (54) and Paul Allen (45*). Pakistan, led by Waqas (76), chased it down in 48.4 overs despite Paul Allen's best efforts (3-54).

2020s

England win the Deaf Ashes for the first time

References

External links 
ECB - Disability Cricket 
England Cricket Association for the Deaf (ECAD)

C
Deaf cricket teams
Deaf culture in the United Kingdom
Deaf cricket team
Disability organisations based in England